Kidstreet is a Canadian electronica trio formed in 2007 in Waterloo, Canada.  The band is composed of two brothers and one sister: Karl Snyder on drums, Cliff Snyder on synth and guitar, and younger sister Edna Snyder on piano and vocals. The trio have a unique form of synth-pop. The band signed with Nettwerk in 2010. Kidstreet have since signed a major licensing deal with Ford. The staccato piano from their song (simply titled "Song") backs the car-maker's latest TV spot as well as Apple's MacBook Pro with retina display TV Spot. Onstage, the band blends electronic elements with live drums, vocals, guitar and synths. They have toured with fellow Canadian artists Dragonette, Mother Mother, Thunderheist and Rich Aucoin as well as international artists Girl Talk and Health.  They performed at the 2011 Canadian Music Week.

Discography
2011: X EP
2011: "Birthday Boy" Single
2011: "Never Coming Back" Single
2011: Fuh Yeah
2012: "Song" Single [This song was first used in Ford's 2009 commercials, followed by most of their 2011 commercials. In 2012, Apple also took this song for their MacBook Pro commercial video.]

References

External links
 Kidstreet at Myspace
 Kidstreet at Nettwerk Records

Musical groups established in 2007
Musical groups from the Regional Municipality of Waterloo
Canadian electronic music groups
2007 establishments in Ontario
Nettwerk Music Group artists